Vijay Jawaharlal Darda (born 14 May 1950,Yavatmal) is a politician from Indian National Congress party, and a Member of the Parliament of India representing Maharashtra in the Rajya Sabha since 1998, having been elected for three consecutive terms into the upper house of the Indian Parliament. He is the chairman of the Lokmat Media Group. He is also the President of the Akhil Bhartiya Sakal Jain Samaj. Darda was President of the Indian Newspaper Society, New Delhi from 1997 to 1998. He continues to be a member of its executive committee.

Early life and political career 
Darda was born in a Shwetambar Jain Family in Yavatmal. His father, Jawaharlal Darda, was a freedom fighter during the independence struggle of India. Jawaharlal Darda launched Lokmat, a daily Marathi newspaper on December 15, 1971, in Nagpur. Vijay J Darda received a diploma in Journalism and Printing Technology from Mumbai University. In 1998, he contested  his first Rajya Sabha election and won as an independent candidate against the Congress candidate Ram Pradhan. After winning as an independent candidate, Congress party nominated him for the 2004 and 2010 Rajya Sabha elections in which he secured victory.

Darda was elected and served as the chairman of Audit Bureau of Circulation (ABC) for 2010–11.

Vijay Darda on 28 June 2022 presented a cheque  worth Rs 71 lakh to defence minister of India Rajnath Singh and Chief of Army Staff General Manoj Pande on behalf of Lokmat Foundation for the construction of houses for the soldiers guarding the War Memorial in Kargil.

Kargil War Memorial was constructed in Kargil in 2004 on the national highway NH-1D from Srinagar to Leh after the Kargil war victory in 1999. Since this place is very close to the Pakistan border and there is a strong possibility of a terror attack here, an Army contingent has been deployed for its security.

Kargil War Memorial Home for Jawans has been built with contribution from Lokmat Foundation and funds collected from members of the public. The War Memorial Home was dedicated to the jawans by Vijay Darda in presence of Rajendra Darda, Brig U S Anand, Brig B S Multani, Lt Gen Anindya Sengupta and Major General Nagendra Singh at Dras (Ladakh) on 23rd Kargil Vijay Diwas on 26th July 2022.

In 1986, he organised All India Kabaddi Gold Trophy Tournament at Yavatmal to promote the Indian game at an international level.

When the execution of the Wardha-Yavatmal-Nanded railway project was delayed, Darda requested authorities to intervene. On 11 June 2014, he made a demand for a separate state for Vidarbha in Parliament because of the problems that people of the region face. He demanded that the first cargo hub of the country should be set up in Nagpur, which would generate widespread employment and fuel growth and development in the region. He said that the Sewagram Ashram at Wardha should be declared a national heritage structure as it has been witness to the 'satyagraha' and national freedom struggle, the release said. He demanded the government to ensure that there was no interference with the freedom of press.

Darda published a book titled Public Issues Before Parliament that compiles his various contributions as a Member of Parliament. The book was released by then Vice President of India Hamid Ansari.

In 2014, Darda actively highlighted the problems of people in Vidarbha region and urged the centre to create a package of INR 200 crores for widows of farmers who committed suicide, and which supported institutions of higher education in the backward region. An agro-based industry model was suggested by him to create alternate employment opportunities. Darda urged for additional financial incentives to attract more industrial investments to the Vidharbha region.

During the meeting of the Consultative Committee of the Members of Parliament for the Ministry of Civil Aviation, Darda raised issues about the Maharashtra government managing airports. He pointed out that the Maharashtra Govt. has no expertise in maintenance of airports and development of infrastructure, and the condition of the airport is deteriorating due to non-appointment of strategic partner who could make investments for development of the airports.

Darda was part of the Pakistan-India Parliamentarians' Dialogue in Islamabad, Pakistan in 2011. He told the press, "The 26/11 incident is important for India and cannot be considered a closed chapter. The trust deficit can also be bridged if steps are taken to release Sarabjit Singh." Darda also said, "Pakistan will have to act on India's long-standing security concerns, including the handing over of Dawood Ibrahim and the prosecution of those involved in the 2008 Mumbai attack case. Visas should also be issued freely and Pakistan can benefit from India's expertise in areas like healthcare. The two sides also have to address key issues like poverty, education and differences over sharing river waters."

Darda raised issues of wildlife conservation in Parliament.

Darda scrupulously followed up in Rajya Sabha on issues including combating global warming, cleaning of the Yamuna river and depleting forest cover in the country. He also proposed the installation of surveillance systems at national parks to check poaching, as well as to mitigate the illegal trade of leopard skin and body parts.

In an exclusive interview with senior journalists in Nagpur, Mr. Vijay Darda said a strong political will is needed to complete his dream project Wardha -Yavatmal-Nanded railway line on time. Darda said he is pursuing this project constantly for last 13 year. So far, he has discussed the project with eleven Railway Ministers and made correspondence with relevant authorities several times. Darda said, original cost of the project 284 km yellow line was 274.55 crore but the cost has escalated to 3,165 crore now in 2021.

Private member bills 

 The National Commission for Hygienic Food, Packed Drinks and Water Bill, 2005
 The Electronic Waste (Handling and Disposal) Bill, 2005
 The Constitution (Amendment) Bill, 2006
 The Whistle Blowers (Protection in Public Interest Disclosures) Bill, 2006
 The Tele-Shopping (Protection of Consumer's Rights) Bill, 2006
 The Commissions for Protection of Child Rights (Amendment) Bill, 2006
 The Rajya Sabha Secretariat (Administration) Bill, 2006
 The Personal Data Protection Bill, 2006
 The Electronic Waste (Handling and Disposal) Bill, 2015
 The Consumer Goods Price Fixation Board Bill, 2015 
 The Gymnasiums and Fitness Centres (Regulation) Bill, 2015
 The Protection of Human Rights (Amendment) Bill, 2005
 The Pathological Laboratories and Clinics (Regulation and Control) Bill, 2006
 The Children School Bags (Limitation on Weight) Bill, 2006
 The Mobile Camera Phone Users (Code of Conduct) Bill, 2006
 The Compulsory Registration of Marriages Bill, 2007
 The Prevention of Atrocities on Women Bill, 2007
 The Consumer Goods Price Fixation Board Bill, 2007
 The Supreme Court (Establishment of a Permanent Bench at Nagpur) Bill, 2007
 The Information Technology and Infotainment Facilities in Villages Bill, 2007
 The Divorced Women (Protection and Welfare) Bill, 2007
 The Code of Criminal Procedure (Amendment) Bill, 2007
 The Gymnasiums and Fitness Centres (Regulation) Bill
 The Special Courts for Scheduled Castes and Scheduled Tribes Bill, 2007

Parliamentary committees, memberships and delegations 

 Member of Parliamentary Standing Committee on Information and Technology (September 2014)
 Member of  Consultative Committee for Petroleum and Natural Gas
 Member of Consultative Committee for the Ministry of Civil Aviation, Government of India (July 2010)
 Member of Rajya Sabha Committee on Subordinate Legislation (September 2010)
 Member of Central Consumer Protection Council, Ministry of Consumer Affairs, Food & Public Distribution (September 2010)
 Member of Philatelic Advisory Committee of the Department of Posts, Ministry of Parliamentary Affairs (November 2010)
 Member, Committee on Member of Parliament Local Area Development Scheme (MPLADS) Aug. 2012 to July 2016
 Participated in India-Yale Parliamentary Leadership Programme (Washington D.C., USA, 2008)
 Delegation visit to Morocco & Tunisia with vice-president of India Dr. Hamid Ansari in 2016
 Committee on Petitions (Date of Re-constitution: 24 September 2009)
 Committee on Subordinate Legislation (Date of Re-constitution: 29 September 2010)
 Committee on Finance(Ministries/Departments : Finance; Corporate Affairs; Planning; Statistics and Programme Implementation) (Date of Constitution: 31 August 2010)
 Attended Security Council Meeting-1992 along with Prime Minister of India: U.N.O. Headquarters, New York
 Member Indian Council of Forestry Research & Education, Government of India, Dehradun (Uttaranchal)
 Member, Environmental Appraisal Committee, Ministry of Environment and Forests, Government of India, New Delhi
 Member, National AIDS Committee, Ministry of Health, Government of India, New Delhi
 Member, Indo-Pak Parliamentary Forum
 2001–Feb. 2004 Member, Consultative Committee for the Ministry of Culture
 2002 onwards Vice-president / Member India-Turkey Parliamentary Friendship Group
 Aug. 2004 onwards Member, Parliamentary Committee to review the rate of Dividend payable by the Indian Railways to the General Revenues
 2005 onwards Member, Indo-Japan Parliamentary Forum
 Feb. 2005 onwards Member, Hindi Salahakar Samiti, Ministry of Company Affairs
 May 2005 onwards Member, Organizing Committee of the Commonwealth Games 2010
 Oct. 2006- May 2009 and July 2010 onwards Permanent Special Invitee, Consultative Committee for the Ministry of Petroleum and Natural Gas
 Member, Hindi Salahakar Samiti, Department of Commerce, Ministry of Commerce and Industry Member, Hindi Salahakar Samiti, Northern Railways
 Consultative Committee for the Ministry of Information and Broadcasting and Ministry of Culture
 Konkan Railways Users Consultative Committee for the Ministry of Railways, 2005
 Member, Hindi Salahakar Samiti, Central Railways Aug. 2012 - May 2014 
 Member, Hindi Salahkar Samiti, Rajya Sabha Secretariat June 2015 to July 2016
 Member, Advisory group, National Tiger Conservation Authority, Ministry of Environment, Forest and Climate Change
 Member, of the Standing Committee on Information Aug. 1998-Feb. 2004  
 Member, of the Standing Committee on Technology Aug. 2004 - Dec. 2006 
 Member, Indo-China Society 2003 to 2010 
 Member, Indo- US Parliamentary Forum 2004 to 2010
 Member, Standing Committee on Finance Aug. 1998-Feb. 2004 and Aug. 2004 - Dec. 
 Member, Bureau of Indian Standards Dec. 2006- May 2009 and Aug. 2009 - Aug. 2012 2006, Sep. 2007- May 2009 and Aug. 2009 - May 2014 and Sept. 2014 to July 2016
 Member Ministry of Civil Aviation and Ministry of Overseas Indian Affairs Aug. 2009 to 2010
 Vice-president, India-Israel Parliamentary Friendship Group May 2013 - May 2014 
 Member, Committee on Science and Technology, Environment and Forests Sept. 2014 to July 2016
 Member, India-Uruguay Parliamentary Friendship Group
 Member, Committee on Commerce 2012 to July 2016
 Member, Parliamentary Forum on HIV/AIDS

Non-parliamentary positions 

 Chairman, News18-Lokmat Marathi News Channel
 Member of Press Council of India, New Delhi (From March 1998 – 2001, March 2001 – 2004)
 Member of the ABC's Council of Management
 Chairman, Jawaharlal Darda Institute of Engineering & Technology (Shri Jawaharlal Darda Education Society) Yavatmal
 President of Amolakchand Mahavidyalaya (Vidya Prasarak Mandal), Yavatmal
 President of Amolakchand Law College (Vidya Prasarak Mandal), Yavatmal
 President of College of Physical Education (Hanuman Vyayamshala Krida Mandal), Yavatmal
 Founder Chairman, Yavatmal Public School (Shri Jawaharlal Darda Education Society), Yavatmal
 President of Anglo Hindi High School and Junior College (Hindi Prasarak Mandal), Yavatmal
 Chairman of Priyadarshini Co-operative Spinning and Ginning Textile Mills Ltd., Yavatmal
 Chairman, Darda Investment And Properties Pvt Ltd 
 Chairman and Director of Vidhya Prasarak Mandal, Yavatmal
 Founder of Amolakchand College of Science, Commerce, Arts and Law 
 Chairman and Director of Jawaharlal Education Trust
 Founder of Matoshree Veenadevi Darda English Medium School at Yavatmal
 President, Vidya Prasarak Mandal

Publications 
 Tapsi: Reminiscences of Veenadevi Darda, My Respected Mother: The Indian Emergency as seen by an Indian (English version)
 Lokmat Congress Centenary Special-1985
 Sanskar Pushpa, discourses of Jain Sadhvi Preeti Sudha Ji
 Raktanjali, a book of inspiring poems written by Col. V.P. Singh dedicated to the Kargil Martyrs
 Straight Thoughts
 Na Sampanare Shabda 
 Seedhi Baat
 Satyam Shivam Sundaram
 Public Issues Before Parliament

Family 
Vijay's brother, Rajendra Darda, was also elected from Aurangabad East Assembly constituency from 1998 thrice. He was the minister of education and industry in Maharashtra Government. Vijay Darda is married to Jyotsna Darda and has two children - Devendra (son) and Purva (daughter). Jawaharlal Darda, his father, was from Yavatmal district. A freedom fighter, Jawaharlal Darda was also the state treasurer for the MPCC. He was part of the cabinet at as the minister for industries and energy of Maharshtra state.

Reception
Being a Congress Member, on 29 July 2012, at a function in Ahmedabad, Darda remarked that Gujarat Chief Minister Narendra Modi is a tiger and a national saint.

In 2012, Darda was reported to have been associated with companies that were awarded coal blocks under the controversial coal allocation by the then Coal Minister Dr Manmohan Singh for a throwaway price. In this controversy, his brother, Rajendra Darda, was also named along with him.

Philanthropy 
Darda is the founder of Shri Jawaharlal Darda Institute of Engineering & Technology at Yavatmal and is the Managing Trustee of Press Institute of Maharashtra, Pune along with Smt. Kusumabai Darda Trust.

Bhari village in the Yavatmal district was adopted by Darda under the Sansad Adarsh Gram Yojana. The village was converted into a model village at a cost of INR 1 crore.

Darda donated INR 5 lakhs to the descendants of Tatya Tope because of the deteriorating condition of the family.

He supported Sultana Begum (great granddaughter of Bahadur Shah Zafar) with the wedding of her daughter.

Darda has worked towards stopping the slaughterhouses and has interest in wildlife conservation owing to his Jain roots.

In 1984, Darda arranged funds for the people who were impacted by floods in Nanded and Parbhani. School buildings were constructed. He supported the Lokmat Relief Fund during earthquakes of Bihar (1988) and Killari (Latur, Marathwada 1993). Kargil Relief funds were raised by him and the group for the martyrs of Kargil from Aurangabad, Nagpur, Lature and Solapur through which hostels were made.

Social and religious 
Under the guidance of Shri Vijay Darda, Lokmat Media Group organised a National Inter-Religious Conference in Nagpur on 24 October 2021. Religious and spiritual leaders from different religions participated in this conference and called for communal harmony and universal brotherhood. The religious leaders who graced the conference included Gurudev Sri Sri Ravi Shankar ji, Founder of Art of Living, Swami Ramdev ji, Founder of Patanjali Yogpeeth, Haridwar, Acharya Dr. Lokeshmuni ji, Founder of  Ahimsa Vishwa Bharti, Brahmaviharidas Swami ji of BAPS Swaminarayan Sanstha, Cardinal Oswald Gracias ji, Archbishop of Mumbai, Pralhad Wamanrao Pai ji of Jeevanvidya Mission, Mumbai, Bhikkhu Sanghasena, Founder of Mahabodhi International Meditation Centre, Leh and Ladakh and Haji Syed Salman Chishty, Gaddi Nashin, Dargah Ajmer Sharif. The Chief Guest of the programme was Shri Nitin Gadkari, Union Minister for Road Transport & Highways, Government of India and the Guest of Honour was Shri Dayashankar Tiwari, Mayor of Nagpur.

Awards and recognition 

 Feroze Gandhi Memorial Award for excellence in Journalism (1990–91)
International jurists award in UK (2011) given by Rt. Hon. Lord Phillips (President of the Supreme Court of the UK) for work in the field of legal education in India's rural areas
Giant International Journalism Award (2016) for best contribution in the field of Journalism in Maharashtra, India
The Best Produced Newspapar for the Best Printing Technology Award by the hand of President of India Shri Giani Zali Singh awarded in 1983.
Nemichand Shrishrimal Foundation Award for the excellence in the field of Journalism in 1996
Journalism award 1997 for the best contribution in the field of Journalism in Maharashtra State
Maharashtra Kala Niketan 7th Maharashtra Cine Natya Paritoshik 2003
Outstanding Youth Person, 1987, by Indian National Jaycees, Chapter-Yavatmal Cotton City Jaycees 
Ten Outstanding Businessmen, Industrialists & Professionals Award, 2001
Brijlal Biyani Award for Journalism, 2006
Yavatmal Bhushan Award 2007, by Yavatmal Rotary Club
Late S.M. Garge Journalism Award for 2007
Mahakaruna Award in recognition of contribution to maintaining love & social harmony in society. The award was given the hands of Bhikkhu Sanghasena ji, founder President & Spiritual Director of Mahabodhi International Meditation Centre, Leh (Ladakh)
Global Peace Award for outstanding leadership and service to the country and humanity during  the International Sufi Rang Mahotsav 2022 organised by Chishty Foundation at Ajmer (Rajasthan)
'Global Achiever' (Best Politician) award at the World Summit for Global Achievers 2022 ceremony organised at Satyagrah Hall in Raj Ghat, New Delhi,

References

External links
 Profile on Rajya Sabha website

Indian National Congress politicians from Maharashtra
Living people
1950 births
Rajya Sabha members from Maharashtra
Darda family